The 1934 North Dakota gubernatorial election was held on November 6, 1934. Democratic nominee Thomas H. Moodie defeated Republican nominee Lydia Cady Langer with 52.98% of the vote.

Primary elections
Primary elections were held on June 27, 1934.

Democratic primary

Candidates
Thomas H. Moodie, Newspaper editor
R. A. Johnson

Results

Republican primary

Candidates
William Langer, former Governor
Thorstein H. H. Thoresen, former North Dakota Tax Commissioner
J. P. Cain

Results

General election

Candidates
Major party candidates
Thomas H. Moodie, Democratic
Lydia Cady Langer, Republican

Other candidates
Pat J. Barrett, Communist

Results

References

1934
North Dakota
Gubernatorial